Tortula protobryoides is a species of moss belonging to the family Pottiaceae.

It is native to Europe and Northern America.

Synonyms:
 Pottia bryoides (Dicks.) Mitt.

References

Pottiaceae